Lakelands Trail State Park, officially the Mike Levine Lakelands Trail State Park since January 20, 2017, is a state park in Michigan that runs east-west from southwest of Munith to Hamburg Township, Michigan. It is a multi-use trail converted from abandoned railroad corridors. According to the Michigan DNR web site, the north side of the trail is for hiking and biking, and the south side is for horseback riding.
A paved section of trail also extends from the edge of the park east of Hamburg Rd. to the west side of Whitmore Lake Rd., just south of its intersection with 9 Mile Rd in Green Oak Township.

From Stockbridge to Pinckney, horses are routinely ridden on the unpaved trail surface. Only the paved portion from just west of Pinckney to the east end in Hamburg Township is consistently usable by bicyclists.

Waypoints
Waypoints for Lakelands Trail State Park.
↑ in the Distance column points to the other waypoint that the distance is between.

References

External links
Lakelands Trail State Park Hamburg Township
Lakelands Trail State Park A1 Trails

Protected areas of Ingham County, Michigan
Protected areas of Livingston County, Michigan
State parks of Michigan
Huron River (Michigan)
Rail trails in Michigan